The 2021 ASUN women's soccer tournament was the postseason women's soccer tournament for the ASUN Conference held from October 29 through November 6, 2021. All rounds of the tournament were hosted at the Western Division champions and Eastern Division champions home stadiums. The eight-team single-elimination tournament consisted of three rounds based on seeding from regular season conference play. The Liberty Flames were the defending tournament champions, and unable to defend their title, losing to Eastern Kentucky in the Quarterfinals.  The Lipscomb Bisons won the tournament after defeating Kennesaw State 1–0 in the final. It was their third title in four years, and third title in program history for Lipscomb and coach Kevin O'Brien. As tournament champions, Lipscomb earned the ASUN's automatic berth into the 2021 NCAA Division I Women's Soccer Tournament.

Bracket
Source:

Schedule

Quarterfinals

Semifinals

Final

Statistics

Goalscorers

All-Tournament team

Source:

MVP in bold

References 

 
ASUN Women's Soccer Tournament